Alexander Fairlie Wijemanne was a Sri Lankan lawyer and politician. He was a Minister of Justice as an elected member of the Senate of Ceylon and served as Sri Lankan Ambassador to Italy and Permanent Representative to FAO. 

Having qualified as a barrister, Wijemanne established his practice as an advocate in the unofficial bar in Matara. A founding member of the United National Party, he first contested the 1947 general election from the Hakmana Electoral District and polled 4th. He was later elected to the Senate of Ceylon and was appointed Minister of Justice by Prime Minister Dudley Senanayake in March 1965 and served till 1970. In 1972, he led the United National Party majority in the Senate when it was abolished. In 1977, he was appointed Sri Lankan Ambassador to Italy and Permanent Representative to FAO. 

Wijemanne married Margie Jayewardene, daughter of Colonel T. G. Jayewardene and sister of Major T. F. Jayewardene. She was a cousin of J. R. Jayewardene.

See also
Sri Lankan Non Career Diplomats
List of political families in Sri Lanka

References

Ambassadors of Sri Lanka to Italy
Ceylonese advocates
Justice ministers of Sri Lanka
Members of the Senate of Ceylon
People from Matara, Sri Lanka
Representatives of Sri Lanka to the Food and Agriculture Organization
Sinhalese lawyers
Sinhalese politicians
Sri Lankan barristers
United National Party politicians
Year of birth missing